St Michael and All Angels’ Church, Sheldon is a Grade II listed parish church in the Church of England in Sheldon, Derbyshire.

History

The original church was said to have had the largest churchyard in England, inasmuch as the church stood on the highway and was unenclosed. By 1864 the old church was in such a dilapidated state that it was unsafe to enter.

The new church was designed by the architect Samuel Rollinson of Chesterfield. The foundation stone was laid by Rev. H.K. Cornish, vicar of Bakewell, on 31 May 1864  and built by Mr. Gyte of Ashford. It was consecrated on 7 October 1864 by the Bishop of Lichfield.

Parish status
The church is in a joint parish with:
All Saints’ Church, Bakewell
Holy Trinity Church, Ashford-in-the-Water
St Anne's Church, Over Haddon
St Katherine's Church, Rowsley

See also
Listed buildings in Sheldon, Derbyshire

References

Sheldon
Sheldon
Churches completed in 1864